San Martino sulla Marrucina is a comune and town in the province of Chieti in the Abruzzo region of Italy.

References

Cities and towns in Abruzzo